Kingsley Kofi Sarfo (born 13 February 1995) is a Ghanaian professional footballer who plays as a midfielder for Cypriot First Division club APOEL and the Ghana national team.

Club career

Malmö FF
Following a promising start in Allsvenskan during 2017 Sarfo was subject to a bid from the title holders Malmö FF, where he agreed personal terms in spite of Sirius holding out for 15 million SEK or €1.5 million. Sarfo's agent stated that his client was only interested in making a move to Malmö because of him needing another year to acquire Swedish citizenship and therefore was not interested in moving abroad as well as wanting UEFA Champions League football. On 22 June 2017 Malmö FF confirmed the signing of Sarfo in a press conference. Sarfo made his debut for Malmö on the first day of the Swedish transfer window, 15 July, as his old club Sirius came to Swedbank Stadion. Sarfo scored a goal on his debut but couldn't help his team to a victory as the game ended 3-3. On 1 October 2017 Sarfo was suspended by the club until further notice after being declared a suspect in a police investigation. After a District Court had decided not to detain him, Sarfo continued to practice with Malmö FF until he was arrested again on 31 January 2018 under new charges. Malmö FF reacted by announcing his shut down. After his criminal conviction for multiple statutory rapes, Malmö FF terminated Sarfo's contract on 12 June 2018.

Olympiakos Nicosia
Sarfo returned to football after a two-year absence when the Director of Football of Olympiakos Nicosia gave him a second chance. He shone in his first year at the club leading it to a top 6 finish and cup final after 30 years. His contract was improved and extended until 2023.

International career
He made his international debut for Ghana in 2017.

Legal issues

Conviction of child rape
On 30 September 2017 Sarfo was requested to be arrested following accusations of one case of attempted rape, and two cases of statutory rape.  As a result of the arrest, Sarfo was suspended from playing for Malmö FF, a suspension that was lifted on 11 January 2018 awaiting the legal process to be completed. On 31 January 2018, Sarfo once again was arrested by the Swedish police, suspected of five cases of statutory rape. On 8 June 2018, he was sentenced to 2 years and 8 months in prison, along with a fine of 150,000 SEK and deportation after having served his jail sentence.

Driving without a valid license
During 2017 Sarfo drove his car on several occasions without holding a valid driver's license in Sweden. According to Swedish law this can result in up to six months in prison. Sarfo was not disciplined by the club in any way.

Career statistics

Club

Honours 
IK Sirius

 Superettan: 2016
Malmö FF
 Allsvenskan: 2017

Individual

 Superettan Player of the Year: 2016
 Superettan Midfielder of the Year: 2016
 Allsvenskan Player of the Month: April 2017
 Cyprus Sports Writers Best XI Team: 2022
 Pancyprian Footballers Association (PASP) Team of the Season: 2021–22

References

External links
 

1995 births
Living people
Ghanaian footballers
Ghanaian criminals
FC Rosengård 1917 players
BW 90 IF players
IK Sirius Fotboll players
Malmö FF players
Superettan players
Allsvenskan players
Association football midfielders
Ghanaian expatriate footballers
Ghanaian expatriate sportspeople in Sweden
Expatriate footballers in Sweden
People convicted of statutory rape offenses
Ghana international footballers
Olympiakos Nicosia players
APOEL FC players
Cypriot First Division players